Scott Warner may refer to:

 Scott Warner (lighting designer), American lighting designer
 Scott Warner (footballer) (born 1983), retired English footballer
 Scott Warner (tennis) (born 1965), American former tennis player